Jamal Ben Saddik (born October 3, 1990) is a Belgian-Moroccan professional kickboxer. He is a former two-time Glory Heavyweight Championship challenger and 2018 Glory Heavyweight Grand Prix tournament winner.

Combat Press ranked him as a top ten heavyweight between September 2015 and July 2021, peaking at No. 3.

In Glory, Ben Saddik was involved in doping controversies and was removed from the official rankings by the promotion in 2023. In 2015 and 2022 he emerged victorious in the bouts against Anderson Silva and Benjamin Adegbuyi, but were both cut short by Ben Saddik testing positive for banned substances and receiving suspensions, with the fights reversed to a 'no contest'.

Personal life
Ben Saddik was born and raised in Antwerp. His parents emigrated to Belgium from the village of Ait Hadifa in northern Morocco. He was taken to a kickboxing gym at the age of 9 by his father, who feared life in the streets would have a negative impact on his son. As a teen, Jamal was shot and grazed with a bullet after a street fight. In 2012, he was diagnosed with thyroid cancer, which would emerge again around a year later. Ben Saddik has since been cancer-free. He was a student of Cor Hemmers until 2021.

Career

Early years
He made his debut in the It's Showtime promotion on March 6, 2011, at Fightingstars presents: It's Showtime Sporthallen Zuid and beat Rico Verhoeven. He was then scheduled to fight Anderson Silva at Fightclub presents: It's Showtime 2011 on May 21, 2011, but the bout was scrapped when Silva was instead moved to the It's Showtime 2011 Lyon card to fight Daniel Ghiță.

He TKO'd Vitaly Oparin in round one at United Glory 15 on March 23, 2012, and followed this up with a fourth-round KO of Nikolaj Falin on June 2, 2012.

Glory 
Ben Saddik lost a decision to Jahfarr Wilnis at Glory 2: Brussels on October 6, 2012.

But, despite this setback, he was invited to compete at Glory 4: Tokyo - 2012 Heavyweight Grand Slam, the biggest heavyweight tournament in kickboxing history, on December 31, 2012. He upset world #4 Errol Zimmerman at the opening stage, taking a decision. In the quarter-finals, he beat Remy Bonjasky on points, but lost via a quick body kick from Daniel Ghiță in the semis. Despite coming back from the tournament empty-handed, Ben Saddik's stock rose greatly by beating two much higher-rated fighters.

Ben Saddik fought Peter Aerts at Glory 8: Tokyo - 2013 65kg Slam on May 3, 2013, in Tokyo. He started well and floored Aerts in round one, but the Dutchman rallied back and dropped him three times in the second, forcing a referee stoppage.

He was knocked out late in round three by Ben Edwards in a slugfest at Glory 12: New York - Lightweight World Championship Tournament in New York City on November 23, 2013.

He was expected to fight Benjamin Adegbuyi at Glory 14: Zagreb in Zagreb, Croatia on March 8, 2014. However he broke his hand while training so he was replaced with Dmytro Bezus.

He knocked out Nicolas Wamba in round two at Glory 16: Denver in Broomfield, Colorado, US on May 3, 2014.

He lost via disqualification when he attacked a downed Hesdy Gerges just seconds into their bout at Qabala Fight Series #1 in Qabala, Azerbaijan on June 29, 2014. Following this incident, Glory suspended him for six months. Ben Saddik would later issue a public apology to both Gerges and fans of the sport.

First suspension and return
Ben Saddik rebounded from his DQ loss to Gerges with a first-round knockout win over Mamoudou Keta, during Glory 22. Ben Saddik won his next outing with Glory as well, defeating Anderson Silva by a third-round TKO. On August 7, 2015, it was announced that Ben Saddik failed a drug test prior to Glory 23: Las Vegas. He was suspended and fined $6,650 by Nevada State Athletic Commission until 8 August 2016. Ben Saddik must also submit clean drugs tests for steroids and diuretics at 30, 10 and 3 days before next fight in Nevada. As a result, his TKO win against Anderson Silva was changed to a no contest.

His next two fights were outside of Glory in the regional circuits. He was first scheduled to fight Brian Douwes during A1 WCC 20. Douwes won the fight by decision. His next fight was against Andre Schmeling during A1 WCC 21.

He also had one with ACB Kickboxing, against Gordon Haupt. Ben Saddik won by a first-round KO.

Returning to Glory, Ben Saddik won decision against Ismael Londt and Guto Inocente.

He was given a chance to fight Rico Verhoeven for the Glory Heavyweight title. Jamal lost to Rico Verhoeven by TKO for the Glory World Championship 49 after his won fight in 2011. He was seen spitting in the face of Rico Verhoeven in a prefight press conference for which he was fined after the incident.

On December 8, 2018, he won the Glory 62 Heavyweight Contender tournament by knocking out Benjamin Adegbuyi in the first round of the final, after winning his fights against Junior Tafa and Guto Inocente in the quarter and semi-final respectively.

He signed a new, long term, contract with Glory in January 2020.

In October 2020, Glory announced Ben Saddik would fight a rubber match with Rico Verhoeven for the Glory Heavyweight title, although they didn't announce a date for the fight. The fight was later scheduled for Glory 77. He withdrew from the bout, 11 days before the event, due to a back injury.

Ben Saddik was scheduled to face Benjamin Adegbuyi at Glory: Collision 3 on October 23, 2021. The two of the previously fought at Glory 62: Rotterdam, in the finals of the 2018 Glory Heavyweight Contender tournament, with Ben Saddik winning by a first-round knockout. Ben Saddik was later rescheduled to face Rico Verhoeven at the same event, as a late replacement for Alistair Overeem, who was forced to withdraw due to an injury. Ben Saddik lost by fourth-round TKO.

Ben Saddik was booked to face the former Enfusion Heavyweight Champion and 2020 Glory 76 Heavyweight Tournament winner Levi Rigters at Glory 80 on March 19, 2022. The bout was cancelled minutes before starting, due to riots breaking out in the crowd.

Second suspension
Ben Saddik faced Benjamin Adegbuyi, in an eliminator for the interim Glory heavyweight championship, at Glory 81: Ben Saddik vs. Adegbuyi 2 on August 20, 2022. He made quick work of his opponent, as he won the fight by a first-round knockout. Ben Saddik knocked Adegubuyi down once prior to the stoppage.

In January 2023, Glory announced Ben Saddik is suspended since his fight with Benjamin Adegbuyi at Glory 81 on 20 August 2022, due to an investigation into a rule violation. It was revealed on February 8, 2023, that he had tested positive for performance enhancing drugs. As a result, his victory over Adegbuyi at Glory 81 was overturned to a no contest. He was also suspended for 15 months, beginning with August 20.

Legal troubles 
On March 10, 2021, he was arrested in Antwerp, Belgium in a major operation targeting organised crime in Belgium and the Netherlands. Ben S. was referred to as the seller ('reseller') of the secured crypto devices. His lawyer emphasized though that the arrest of Jamal Ben Saddik has nothing to do with the trade in or possession of prohibited substances such as cocaine (Operation Sky). On March 12, 2021, the Mechelen Council Chamber ordered Ben Saddik to be jailed for 30 days. His attorney immediately filed an appeal. The appeal will be decided in 14 days by the Antwerp Court of Appeal.

Championships and accomplishments
Glory
2018 Glory Heavyweight Grand Prix (+95 kg/209.4 lb) Winner
CombatPress.com
2015 "Comeback of the Year"
2018 "Comeback Fighter of the Year"

Kickboxing record 

|-
|- style="background:#c5d2ea;"
| 2022-08-20 || NC ||align=left| Benjamin Adegbuyi || Glory 81: Ben Saddik vs. Adegbuyi 2 || Düsseldorf, Germany || NC (Overturned) || 1 || 2:34 
|-
! style=background:white colspan=9 | 
|-
|- bgcolor="#FFBBBB"
| 2021-10-23 || Loss ||align=left| Rico Verhoeven || Glory Collision 3  || Arnhem, Netherlands || TKO (Punches) || 4 || 0:56
|-
! style=background:white colspan=9 |
|-
|-  bgcolor="#CCFFCC"
| 2018-12-08 || Win||align=left nowrap| Benjamin Adegbuyi || Glory 62: Rotterdam Final || Rotterdam, Netherlands || KO (Left hook)|| 1 ||  1:52
|-
! style=background:white colspan=9 |
|-
|-  bgcolor="#CCFFCC"
| 2018-12-08 || Win||align=left| Guto Inocente || Glory 62: Rotterdam Semi Final|| Rotterdam, Netherlands || Decision (Unanimous) ||  ||  3:00
|-
|-  bgcolor="#CCFFCC"
| 2018-12-08 || Win||align=left| Junior Tafa || Glory 62: Rotterdam Quarter Final|| Rotterdam, Netherlands || TKO (2 Knockdowns Rule) || 1 ||  2:55
|-
|-  bgcolor="#CCFFCC"
| 2018-09-29 || Win||align=left| D'Angelo Marshall || Glory 59: Amsterdam || Amsterdam, Netherlands || TKO (3 Knockdowns Rule) || 1 ||  0:57
|-
|-  bgcolor="#FFBBBB"
| 2018-05-12 || Loss||align=left| Jahfarr Wilnis || Glory 53: Lille || Lille, France || Decision (Unanimous) || 3 ||  3:00
|-
|-  bgcolor="#FFBBBB"
| 2017-12-10 || Loss ||align=left| Rico Verhoeven || Glory 49: Rotterdam || Rotterdam, Netherlands || TKO (Head kick and Punches) || 5 || 1:10
|-
! style=background:white colspan=9 |
|-
|-  bgcolor="#CCFFCC"
| 2017-03-25 || Win ||align=left| Guto Inocente || Glory 39: Brussels || Brussels, Belgium || Decision (Unanimous) || 3 ||  3:00
|-
|-  bgcolor="#CCFFCC"
| 2016-12-10 || Win ||align=left| Ismael Londt || Glory: Collision || Oberhausen, Germany || Decision (Unanimous) || 3 || 3:00
|-
|-  bgcolor="#CCFFCC"
| 2016-10-16 || Win ||align=left| Gordon Haupt || |ACB KB 8: Only The Braves || Hoofddorp, Netherlands || KO (Right hook) || 1 || 1:24
|-
|-  bgcolor="#CCFFCC"
| 2016-05-28 || Win ||align=left| Andre Schmeling || A1 World Combat Cup 21 || Eindhoven, Netherlands || KO (Right uppercut) || 1 ||
|-
|-  bgcolor="#FFBBBB"
| 2015-11-28 || Loss ||align=left| Brian Douwes || A1 World Combat Cup 20 || Eindhoven, Netherlands || Decision || 3 || 3:00
|-
|-  bgcolor="#c5d2ea"
| 2015-08-07 || NC ||align=left| Anderson Silva || Glory 23: Las Vegas || Las Vegas, Nevada, USA || NC (Overturned) || 3 || 2:55
|-
! style=background:white colspan=9 |
|-
|-  bgcolor="#CCFFCC"
| 2015-06-05 || Win ||align=left| Mamoudou Keta || Glory 22: Lille || Lille, France, || KO (Punches) || 1 || 1:59
|-
|-  bgcolor="#FFBBBB"
| 2014-06-29 || Loss ||align=left| Hesdy Gerges || Qabala Fight Series #1 || Qabala, Azerbaijan || DQ (Attack on a downed opponent) || 1 || 0:20
|-
|-  bgcolor="#CCFFCC"
| 2014-05-03 || Win ||align=left| Nicolas Wamba || Glory 16: Denver || Broomfield, Colorado, USA || TKO (Left Hook) || 2 || 1:24
|-
|-  bgcolor="#FFBBBB"
| 2013-11-23 || Loss ||align=left| Ben Edwards || Glory 12: New York || New York City, New York, USA || KO (Right Hook) || 3 || 2:52 
|-  bgcolor="#FFBBBB"
| 2013-05-03 || Loss ||align=left| Peter Aerts || Glory 8: Tokyo || Tokyo, Japan || TKO (Referee Stoppage) || 2 || 
|-  bgcolor="#FFBBBB"
| 2012-12-31 || Loss ||align=left| Daniel Ghiță || Glory 4: Tokyo - Heavyweight Grand Slam, Semi Finals || Saitama, Japan || KO (Liver kick) || 1 || 0:35
|-  bgcolor="#CCFFCC"
| 2012-12-31 || Win ||align=left| Remy Bonjasky || Glory 4: Tokyo - Heavyweight Grand Slam, Quarter Finals || Saitama, Japan || Decision (Unanimous) || 2 || 2:00
|-  bgcolor="#CCFFCC"
| 2012-12-31 || Win ||align=left| Errol Zimmerman || Glory 4: Tokyo - Heavyweight Grand Slam, First 16 || Saitama, Japan || Decision (Unanimous) || 2 || 2:00
|-  bgcolor="#FFBBBB"
| 2012-10-06 || Loss ||align=left| Jahfarr Wilnis || Glory 2: Brussels || Brussels, Belgium || Decision (Unanimous) || 3 || 3:00
|-  bgcolor="#CCFFCC"
| 2012-06-02 || Win ||align=left| Nikolaj Falin ||  || The Netherlands || KO (Punches) || 2 ||
|-  bgcolor="#CCFFCC"
| 2012-03-23 || Win ||align=left| Vitaliy Oparin || United Glory 15 || Moscow, Russia || TKO || 1 || 
|-  bgcolor="#CCFFCC"
| 2011-03-06 || Win ||align=left| Rico Verhoeven || It's Showtime Sporthallen Zuid ||Amsterdam, Netherlands || TKO (Corner Stoppage) || 2 || 1:00
|-
| colspan=9 | Legend:

See also
 List of male kickboxers

References

External links 
Profile at GLORY  

1990 births
Living people
Sportspeople from Antwerp
Moroccan male kickboxers
Belgian male kickboxers
Heavyweight kickboxers
Glory kickboxers
Doping cases in kickboxing
Moroccan sportspeople in doping cases
Belgian sportspeople in doping cases
Moroccan expatriate sportspeople in the Netherlands
Belgian expatriate sportspeople in the Netherlands